Hirtellina is a genus of flowering plants in the thistle tribe within the daisy family.

 Species
 Hirtellina fruticosa (L.) Dittrich - Greek islands
 Hirtellina kurdica (Merxm. & Rech.f.) Dittrich - Iraq
 Hirtellina lanceolata Cass. - Crete
 Hirtellina lobelii (DC.) Dittrich - Cyprus, Lebanon, Syria, Turkey

References

Cynareae
Asteraceae genera